Queen Jeongsun (정순왕후 김씨; 2 December 1745 – 11 February 1805), of the Gyeongju Kim clan, was a posthumous name bestowed to the wife and second queen consort of Yi Geum, King Yeongjo, the 21st Joseon monarch. She was queen consort of Joseon from 1759 until her husband's death in 1776, after which she was honoured as Queen Dowager Yesun (예순왕대비) during the reign of her step-grandson Yi San, King Jeongjo and as Grand Queen Dowager Yesun (예순대왕대비) during the reign of her step great-grandson Yi Gong, King Sunjo.

Biography

Early life 
On 2 February 1745, Lady Kim was born to Kim Han-gu and Lady Won of the Wonju Won clan. She was born in the wealthy sector of Seosan, South Chungcheong Province during the reign of King Yeongjo, her future husband. Her hometown was Yeoju, Gyeonggi Province, and was a scion of the Gyeongju Kim clan. She had one older brother and a younger brother.

Marriage and becoming queen
After the death of Queen Jeongseong in 1757, King Yeongjo held bridal selections to choose his second queen. His father had banned former concubines from becoming queen, so King Yeongjo could not elevate one of his concubines to queenship, as many former kings had done.

On 9 June 1759, Queen Jeongsun was chosen as queen. During the bridal selections, Yeongjo allegedly asked the candidates what the deepest thing in the world was. Some cited the mountains, the sea, or a parent’s love, but she cited the human heart, capturing his attention on her wisdom. When asked about the most beautiful flower, she answered, "The cotton flower is the most beautiful flower, although it does not exude fashion and scent, but it is the most beautiful flower that warms the people by weaving thread."

On 22 June 1759, Queen Jeongsun formally married King Yeongjo at Changgyeong Palace. This marriage was considered the oldest marriage in Joseon Dynasty history as Yeongjo was 64 years old, and the Queen was 13 years old at the time of the marriage. She was also 10 years younger than her husband's son and heir, Crown Prince Sado, and his daughter-in-law, Lady Hyegyeong.

Queen Jeongsun's father was given the royal title of "Internal Prince Oheung" (Hangul: 오흥부원군, Hanja: 鰲興府院君), and her mother was given the royal title "Internal Princess Consort Wonpung of the Wonju Won Clan" (Hangul: 원풍부부인 원주 원씨, Hanja: 原豊府夫人 原州 元氏). The Queen was known to be a little assertive towards her husband. When it had come to get measured for clothing, the palace maid had politely asked the King to turn his back. Yet, she also asked her husband in a decisive tone saying, "Can you turn around?".

She and her husband shared a deep love for one another, but despite that, they had produced no princes or princesses. There was no record of the young queen bearing children, or having a miscarriage.

Crown Prince Sado died in 1762 and his sister, Yi Yong-wan, Princess Hwawan, became protectress of Sado's son, Yi San. Yeongjo died on 22 April 1776 and Yi San ascended to the throne as the 22nd Joseon monarch (temple name: Jeongjo). As widow of a king, she was honoured as Queen Dowager Yesun. Hong Bong-han, Jeongjo's maternal grandfather, and Jeong Hu-gyeom, Princess Hwawan's adoptive son, protested this decision. Yesun's older brother, Kim Gwi-ju, advised his sister to wait for the right moment, but Jeongjo acted first. He dismissed Hong Bong-han and Jeong Hu-gyeom from office. However, Jeongjo later exiled Kim Gwi-ju to Heuksan Island on the grounds of disrespect towards the King's mother, Lady Hyegyeong, but the real reason was because of Kim Gwi-ju's involvement with Hong Bong-han's dismissal during Yeongjo's reign. This action caused unspoken tension and extreme confrontations between Yesun and Jeongjo.

Regency
In 1800, Jeongjo died of an abscess on his back at age 49. He died 15 days after first being treated. His last words were 'Sujeongjeon Hall,' which was the residence of Yesun, giving rise to speculation to this day that Jeongjo was poisoned by the Queen Dowager. He was succeeded by his 10 years old son, Yi Gong (temple name: King Sunjo) and Yesun raised to the status of Grand Queen Dowager. As the most senior-generation member of the royal family, Yesun acted as regent for the young king and exerted the power until she voluntarily gave it up in 1803. She departed from the policy of the late King, enforcing the Catholic Persecution of 1801 and favoring the Noron Byeokpa faction.

Yesun had purged a large number of conflicting Soron sects, executed Jeongjo's half-brother and maternal uncle, Prince Euneon and Hong Nak-im, abolished Jang Yong-young established by Jeongjo, and massively defeated the Catholic Church that Jeongjo had tolerated. It was repressed and expelled other people and the Soron faction.

She also hired a large number of Noron Bukpa officials, such as Kim Gwan-ju and Kim Yong-ju, whom she had struck by Jeongjo. In 1802, in accordance with Jeongjo's law, she had Kim Jo-sun's daughter, the future Queen Sunwon, became the queen consort of Sunjo, and Kim Jo-sun was sealed to Internal Prince Yeongan (永安府院君) and was resigned from her rule.

On 9 February 1804, after reaping the convergence and cleansing, when Sunjo's family was declared, most of the bureaucrats were purged by Kim Jo-sun, the father of Queen Sunwon, and the power of King Jeongjo. Her influence was weakened, and she had a futile last year of reign, and a year later, on 11 February 1805, she died in Gyeongbokjeon at Changdeokgung Palace. She was posthumous honoured as Queen Jeongsun.

Death 
Queen Jeongsun is buried with her husband King Yeongjo and his first wife, Queen Jeongseong, in the dynastic tombs at Donggureung, the royal tomb of Wonneung (원릉, 元陵), in the city of Guri, Gyeonggi Province.

Family 
Parent
 Father − Kim Han-gu (김한구, 金漢耉) (23 February 1723 – 5 November 1769)
 1) Grandfather − Kim Seon-gyeong (김선경, 金選慶)) (1699 – 19 September 1760)
 2) Great-Grandfather − Kim Du-gwang (김두광, 金斗光)
 3) Great-Great-Grandfather − Kim Gye-jin (김계진, 金季珍)
 4) Great-Great-Great-Grandfather − Kim Hong-ok (김홍욱) (25 June 1602 – 27 August 1657)
 5) Great-Great-Great-Great-Grandfather − Kim Jeok (김적, 金積)
 6) Great-Great-Great-Great-Great-Grandfather − Kim Ho-yoon (김호윤, 金好尹)
 5) Great-Great-Great-Great-Grandmother − Lady Choi of the Hwasun Choi clan (화순 최씨)
 4) Great-Great-Great-Grandmother − Lady Oh of the Dongbok Oh clan (동복 오씨)
 1) Grandmother − Lady Hong of the Namyang Hong clan (증 정경부인 남양 홍씨, 贈 貞敬夫人 南陽 洪氏) (1704–1754)
 Uncle − Kim Han-gi (김한기, 金漢耆) (1728–1792)
 Aunt-in-law − Lady Han of the Cheongju Han clan (청주 한씨)
 Uncle − Kim Han-ro (김한로, 金漢老) (1746 – ?)
 Mother − Internal Princess Consort Wonpung of the Wonju Won clan (원풍부부인 원주 원씨) (1722–1769)
 1) Grandfather − Won Man-jik (원명직, 元命稷) (1683–1725)
 1) Step grandmother − Lady Yi of the Deoksu Yi clan (증 정부인 덕수 이씨, 贈 貞夫人 德水 李氏) (1682–1718)
 1) Grandmother − Lady Sim of the Cheongseong Sim clan (청송 심씨, 靑松 沈氏) (1696–1776); Won Man-jik’s second wife

Siblings
 Older brother − Kim Gwi-ju (김귀주, 金龜柱) (1740–1786)
 Sister-in-law − Lady Yi of the Deoksu Yi clan (증 정부인 덕수 이씨, 贈 貞夫人 德水 李氏) (1741–1767)
 Nephew − Kim No-chong (김노충, 金魯忠)
 Sister-in-law − Lady Park of the Bannam Park clan (반남 박씨, 潘南 朴氏); Kim Gwi-ju's second wife
 Nephew − Kim No-seo (김노서, 金魯恕)
 Younger brother − Kim In-ju (김인주, 金麟柱) 
 Sister-in-law − Lady Hong of the Namyang Hong clan (남양 홍씨, 南陽 洪氏)

Consort
 Husband − Yi Geum, King Yeongjo (조선 영조) (31 October 1694 – 22 April 1776) — No issue.
 Father-in-law − Yi Sun, King Sukjong (숙종대왕) (7 October 1661 – 12 July 1720)
 Mother-in-law − Royal Noble Consort Suk of the Haeju Choi clan (숙빈 최씨, 淑嬪 崔氏) (17 December 1670 – 9 April 1718)
 Legal mother-in-law − Queen Inwon of the Gyeongju Kim clan (인원왕후 김씨, 仁元王后 金氏) (3 November 1687 – 13 May 1757)

In popular culture
Portrayed by Kim Yong-sun in the 1988–1989 MBC TV series The Memoirs of Lady Hyegyeong.
Portrayed by Kim Ja-ok in the 1991 KBS1 TV series The Royal Way.
Portrayed by Lee In-hye in the 1998 MBC TV series The King's Road.
 Portrayed by Kim Yeong-ran in the 2000 KBS2 TV series Novel: Admonitions on Governing the People
Portrayed by Yeom Ji-yoon in the 2001 MBC TV series Hong Guk-yeong.
 Portrayed by Kim Ae-ri in the 2007 KBS TV series Conspiracy in the Court
Portrayed by Kim Hee-jong in the 2007 CGV TV series Eight Days, Assassination Attempts against King Jeongjo.
Portrayed by Kim Yeo-jin in the 2007–2008 MBC TV series Lee San, Wind of the Palace.
Portrayed by Yoon Min-ju in the 2007 musical King Jeongjo
Portrayed by Im Ji-eun in the 2008 SBS TV series Painter of the Wind.
Portrayed by Geum Dan-bi in the 2011 SBS TV series Warrior Baek Dong-soo.
Portrayed by Ha Seung-ri in the 2014 SBS TV series Secret Door.
Portrayed by Han Ji-min in the 2014 film The Fatal Encounter.
Portrayed by Seo Ye-ji in the 2015 film The Throne.
Portrayed by Jang Hee-jin in the 2021 MBC TV series The Red Sleeve.

References

External links 
 

18th-century Korean people
19th-century women rulers
1745 births
1805 deaths
Regents of Korea
Royal consorts of the Joseon dynasty
Korean queens consort
18th-century Korean women
19th-century Korean women
People from Yeoju